Pyotr Ivanovich Lyashchenko (22 October 1876 – 24 July 1955) was a Russian economist and a specialist in the field of economy of agriculture and history of the national economy of Russia and the USSR. Professor, Rector of Tomsk Imperial University in 1916.

Biography 
Pyotr Ivanovich Lyashchenko was born on 22 October 1876 (10 October Old Style) in Saratov. In 1894 he graduated from the 1st Saratov Classical Gymnasium.

He graduated with honors from the Faculty of Physics and Mathematics (1899) and from the Economics Department of the Faculty of Law (1900) of St. Petersburg Imperial University. In 1900—1901 he trained at the University of Leipzig and at the Agricultural Institute. Privat-docent of the Agricultural Institute (1903—1908). He lectured on political economy, agrarian problems and statistics at the Faculty of Law (1908, 1910-1913). In 1910 he worked at Yuryev University. In 1913—1917 he was a Professor of Tomsk Imperial University (Department of Political Economy), where in 1914—1917 he was the Dean of Law Faculty. In 1914 he defended his Master thesis in agriculture at Kharkov Imperial University. In June 1916 he served as Rector of Tomsk Imperial University. After a conflict with part of the faculty professors in May 1917, he moved to Warsaw (Rostov) University.

After the October Revolution he did scientific and pedagogical work in Rostov-on-Don (Professor of Rostov State University; in 1918—1922 — Rector of the Don Institute of National Economy), in Moscow (Institute of Red Professors, Moscow State University, Institute of Economics of USSR Academy of Sciences), and in Kiev (senior researcher of the Institute economy of the Ukrainian Academy of Sciences). In 1949 he was awarded Stalin Prize for his work "History of the National Economy of the USSR" (3rd volume was published posthumously).

Lyashchenko died on 24 July 1955 in Moscow and was buried at Vagankovo Cemetery.

References 

1876 births
1955 deaths
Academic staff of Southern Federal University
Saint Petersburg State University alumni
Soviet economists
Economists from the Russian Empire
Stalin Prize winners
Academic staff of Tomsk State University
Academic staff of Moscow State University
Academic staff of the University of Tartu